James Patrick Whalen Jr. (born December 11, 1977) is a former football tight end in the National Football League (NFL) for the Dallas Cowboys. He played college football at the University of Kentucky, and earned All-American honors.

Early years
Whalen attended La Salle High School in Milwaukie, Oregon. As a sophomore, he became a starter at wide receiver. He posted a combined 75 receptions for 1,300 yards and 25 touchdowns in his second and third years, earning All-league honors each season.

As a senior, he helped his team win the league championship, while finishing with 68 catches for 1,502 yards and 18 touchdowns, receiving Tri-Valley League Player of the Year and All-state honors. He was a second-team All-state basketball selection at forward as a senior. He also lettered as a third baseman and pitcher in baseball.

College career
Whalen moved on to Shasta College, where he had one undistinguished season with 19 receptions for 154 yards and one  touchdown. The next year, he walked on at the University of Kentucky, after showing head coach Hal Mumme a highlight video tape made by his mother.

As a sophomore, he had 7 receptions for 66 yards. The next year, he was converted from wide receiver to tight end, recording 23 receptions for 239 yards and 3 touchdowns.

As a senior he had a breakout season, being recognized as a consensus first-team All-American, after registering 90 receptions for 1,019 yards and 10 touchdowns, leading the tight ends in all three categories nationally. He set NCAA records for most receptions in a season and most receptions per game (8.2) by a tight end. His 90 receptions broke the school's single-season record and became the first tight end and second Kentucky player to top 1,000 receiving yards in a season. His 10 receiving touchdowns in a single-season at the time ranked second in school history.

In 2016, he was named a Kentucky SEC Football Legend.

Professional career

Tampa Bay Buccaneers
Whalen was selected by the Tampa Bay Buccaneers in the fifth round (157th overall pick) of the 2000 NFL Draft, after dropping because it was considered he lacked size and speed. He was waived on August 27, after being passed on the depth chart by undrafted free agent Todd Yoder.

Dallas Cowboys
On August 30, 2000, the Dallas Cowboys signed Whalen to their practice squad and promoted him to the active roster on December 5, for the last 3 games of the season.

The next year, he was allocated to the Scottish Claymores of NFL Europe, where he led the league in receptions (66) and also had 691 receiving yards (second in the league) and 3 touchdowns. In 2001, he was declared inactive for the season opener. On September 22, he was placed on the injured reserve list with a strained right Achilles.

In 2002, he was a core special teams player and tallied 15 tackles (fourth on the team). In 2003, he suffered hamstring and ankle injuries that limited him to playing in only 9 games (2 starts) and registering 7 special teams tackles. He was released on July 26, 2004.

Cincinnati Bengals
On July 28, 2004, the Cincinnati Bengals signed him as a free agent. He was cut on September 5.

Philadelphia Eagles
On February 22, 2005, he was signed as a free agent by the Philadelphia Eagles to compete for a backup tight end position. He was released on August 28.

References

1977 births
Living people
Sportspeople from Milwaukie, Oregon
Players of American football from Oregon
American football tight ends
All-American college football players
Shasta Knights football players
Kentucky Wildcats football players
Dallas Cowboys players
Scottish Claymores players